Annie Lambrechts is a Belgian roller skating champion. She was awarded the Belgian Sportsman of the year prize in 1981. The same year she was also given the Belgian National Sports Merit Award. She won a total of 140 Belgian titles, 22 European titles, 2 gold and 2 bronze medals at the 1981 World Games. Between 1964 and 1981 she won 19 worldtitles.
She was also the first Belgian to win the Flemish Sportsjewel in 1982.

She was married to former athlete André Dehertoghe.

Records

References

Living people
Belgian sportspeople
Year of birth missing (living people)
World Games gold medalists
World Games bronze medalists
Competitors at the 1981 World Games